Menzoberranzan is a 1994 role-playing video game created by Strategic Simulations (SSI) and DreamForge Intertainment. Menzoberranzan uses the same game engine as SSI's previous game, Ravenloft: Strahd's Possession (1994), and is set in the Advanced Dungeons & Dragons Forgotten Realms campaign setting.

Story
Menzoberranzan, an underground city populated by the Drow, had been introduced in the game materials two years earlier in December 1992 in a three-book box set called Menzoberranzan: The Famed City of the Drow by Ed Greenwood, R. A. Salvatore, and Douglas Niles. The game also features Drizzt Do'Urden as one of the main characters.

Gameplay
The game has elements of Ultima Underworld: The Stygian Abyss (3d world and real-time action) and its game concept is somewhat similar to Westwood's Eye of the Beholder series.  The player initially creates two player characters (PCs) and can acquire non-player character (NPC) allies later in the game.

Release
Menzoberranzan was published in 1994 by Strategic Simulations.

The game was later included in the 1996 compilation set, the AD&D Masterpiece Collection.

On August 20, 2015, game distributor GOG.com released the PC version of the game along with several other Gold Box titles.

Critical reception

In Computer Gaming World, Scorpia wrote, "Overall, Menzoberranzan is a disappointment. It has some nice features, but nice features must be supported by a strong story. Sadly, what could have been a superior entry in the CRPG field comes off as just another hack-n-slash product". Andrew Wright of PC Zone considered it "a case of dumb dungeoneering stylishly put together", and stated that it "tries to be Ultima Underworld and fails miserably." He offered praise to its graphics and interface.

A reviewer for Next Generation gave the game 3 out of 5 stars, remarking that the high-resolution graphics have a "painting-like quality" and that the gameplay is authentic to the Advanced Dungeons & Dragons franchise. T. Liam McDonald of PC Gamer US called Menzoberranzan the best Advanced Dungeons & Dragons game ever released, and praised its graphics and story. However, he complained that it is "combat oriented in early levels and takes its sweet time getting to the narrative elements."

In Electronic Entertainment, Al Giovetti summarized the game as "high-quality role-playing meets fast-paced first-person exploration and spectacular real-time combat", and he believed that it was "a sure bet to please role players." Ian Cole from the Quandaryland website awarded the game 3.5 stars out 5. He was critical of the slowness of the game compared to Ravenloft and that "too many places were empty — just nothing". He praises that this was not a typical hack and slash game with a lot of character's statistics and puzzle solving. John Terra of Computer Shopper said the game "stands out" and called it a "must-have".

According to Allen Rausch of GameSpy, "without a great plot and exciting monsters that truly utilized its spectacular setting, Menzoberranzan ended up being less impressive than it was in players' imaginations".

Dungeons and Desktops: The History of Computer Role-Playing Games said "the last TSR-licensed game SSI published is the infamously wretched (and hard to spell) Menzoberranzan, which appeared in 1994 for DOS. [...] [It] had all the ingredients necessary for a hit. [...] Nevertheless, gamers quickly complained about the endless number of boring battles that drag out the game and ruin its pacing".

Reviews
White Wolf Inphobia #55 (May, 1995)

References

External links
 

1994 video games
DOS games
DreamForge Intertainment games
FM Towns games
Forgotten Realms video games
NEC PC-9801 games
Role-playing video games
Single-player video games
Strategic Simulations games
Video games developed in the United States
Video games featuring protagonists of selectable gender